Janet Kainembabazi Museveni (née Kataaha; born June 24, 1948) is a Ugandan politician who has been the First Lady of Uganda since 1986. She is married to President Yoweri Museveni, with whom she has four children. She has been Cabinet Minister of Education and Sports in the Ugandan Cabinet, since 6 June 2016, although her own education record is questioned. She previously served as Minister for Karamoja Affairs in the Cabinet of Uganda from 27 May 2011 until 6 June 2016. She also served as the elected Member of Parliament representing Ruhaama County in Ntungamo District, between 2011 and 2016. She published her autobiography, My Life's Journey, in 2011.

Early life and marriage
Janet Kainembabazi Kataaha was born in Kajarra County, Ntungamo District to Mr. Edward Birori and Mrs. Mutesi.  She attended Kyamate Primary School, and Bweranyangi Girls' Senior Secondary School in Uganda.  She was awarded a Master of Arts in Organisational Leadership and Management on 30th October 2015 from Uganda Christian University.

Janet Museveni went into exile in 1971, when Idi Amin toppled the Milton Obote regime in a military coup. She married Yoweri Museveni in August 1973. When Idi Amin's regime fell from power in April 1979, she moved back to Uganda from Tanzania where she had been living in exile with her husband.

In February 1981 when Yoweri Museveni launched his guerrilla war against the government of President Obote, Janet Museveni and her children re-located to Nairobi, Kenya, where they lived with family friends until 1983. In 1983, they moved to Gothenburg, Sweden, and stayed there until May 1986, four months after Yoweri Museveni's National Resistance Army had seized power in Kampala.

Career
Janet Museveni founded the Uganda Women's Effort to Save Orphans (UWESO), a private relief agency in late 1986, which she said was shaped by her experience as a refugee. She became involved with the HIV/AIDS campaigns in Uganda in the 1990s, forging ties with radical pastor Martin Ssempa for abstinence-only sex education in Uganda.

In November 2005, she announced that she would seek the parliamentary seat of Ruhaama county in the February 2006 general elections. She contested the seat against the candidate for the Forum for Democratic Change, Augustine Ruzindana, and won overwhelmingly. She was re-elected in March 2011 to another five-year term.

On 16 February 2009, Janet Museveni was appointed State Minister for Karamoja Affairs, by her husband, President Yoweri Museveni.

On 27 May 2011, she was elevated to Minister for Karamoja Affairs, complete with a State Minister for Karamoja Affairs.

On 6 June 2016, after her husband's re-election as President, she was appointed Minister of Education and Sports.

Children
The four children of Janet and Yoweri Museveni are:
 Muhoozi Kainerugaba – Born 1974, General in the UPDF and a Presidential Adviser.
 Natasha Karugire – Born 1976, fashion designer and consultant. Married to Edwin Karugire. Private Secretary to the President of Uganda for Household Affairs.
 Patience Rwabwogo – Born 1978, pastor of Covenant Nations Church, Buziga, Kampala – Married to Odrek Rwabwogo.
 Diana Kamuntu – Born 1980, married to Geoffrey Kamuntu.

Published works

See also
Parliament of Uganda
Cabinet of Uganda
Government of Uganda
Henry Tumukunde

References

External links

Profile of Janet Museveni In 2012
Janet Museveni Speech, IISD Conference, Kampala, April 2004
Extended Museveni Family

1949 births
First Ladies of Uganda
Members of the Parliament of Uganda
Ugandan Christians
Living people
Uganda Christian University alumni
People from Ntungamo District
National Resistance Movement politicians
Government ministers of Uganda
Women government ministers of Uganda
Women members of the Parliament of Uganda
People educated at Bweranyangi Girls' Senior Secondary School
Yoweri Museveni
21st-century Ugandan politicians
21st-century Ugandan women politicians